Terry Troxell (ca 1948 - June 2009) was a hydroplane driver, known best for racing Unlimited Hydroplanes.

Troxell won the 2005 American Power Boat Association Gold Cup driving the Miss Al Deeby Dodge hydroplane.

References

2009 deaths
American motorboat racers
Hydroplanes
Year of birth uncertain